Erica Mendez is an American voice actress who has voiced in English dubs for Funimation, Bang Zoom! and Studiopolis. She studied graphic design in college for three years prior to becoming a voice actress.

Career 
Mendez's first major voice role was the titular character Pac-Man in the Pac-Man and the Ghostly Adventures video game, which was released in 2013. In 2014, Mendez starred as Aladdin in the Magi: The Labyrinth of Magic series and Ryuko Matoi in the English dub of Kill la Kill, the latter of which was broadcast on the Toonami block on Adult Swim. Some of Mendez's other major roles include Haruka Tenoh/Sailor Uranus in the Viz Media English dub of Sailor Moon, Maki Harukawa in Danganronpa V3: Killing Harmony, Gon Freecss in the English dub of the 2011 anime adaptation of Hunter x Hunter and Retsuko in the English dub of Netflix anime series Aggretsuko, Annie in the fighting game Skullgirls, Kamisato Ayaka in Genshin Impact, Wang Ai Ling in the English-language Chinese animated series Stitch & Ai, Diane in The Seven Deadly Sins, Arle Nadja in the Puyo Puyo series, Emma in The Promised Neverland and Itsuki Sumeragi in the English dub of the Netflix anime Kakegurui.

Personal life 
Mendez identifies as asexual.

Filmography

Anime

Animation

Films

Video games

References

External links
 
 
 
 
 
 

Living people
Actresses from Chicago
Actresses from Los Angeles
American actresses of Mexican descent
American video game actresses
American voice actresses
Asexual women
Hispanic and Latino American actresses
21st-century American actresses
21st-century LGBT people
LGBT actresses
LGBT people from Illinois
Year of birth missing (living people)